The Veslyana – is a river in Perm Krai and Komi Republic, Russia, a left tributary of the Kama, which in turn is a tributary of the Volga. 

Main tributaries: 
Left: Travyanka, Ruch, Bolshoy Kub, Maly Kub, Dozovka;
Right: Bolshoy Chabes, Maly Chabes, Vizyakha, Chyornaya, Utva.

References

External links 
Encyclopedia of Perm Krai

Rivers of Perm Krai